Ernesto Pérez (born 23 October 1964 in Badiraguato, Sinaloa, Mexico) better known by his stage name El Chapo de Sinaloa (Spanish: The Shorty from Sinaloa), is a Regional Mexican singer and actor. He started out professionally as a Norteño singer, but has since been primarily focused with Banda, as well as some Mariachi songs.

He first played with local groups at age 11 as a clarinetist. Later, he learned to play bass, and found work as a session musician with regional Mexican labels. In the 1990s he signed with EMI Latin and launched a solo career. Since then he has released over a dozen albums, which have been successful both in Mexico and the United States; he has recorded for Sony Discos and D Disa. His 2007 album Te Va a Gustar was his most successful  in America and was nominated for a Latin Grammy.

Discography
El Chichi (1995)
13 Toneladas (1996)
Chapo de Sinaloa (1996)
Padre de Todos (1999)
Tienda Surtida (1999)
Me Dicen el Rey (2000)
Andamos Borrachos Todos (2000)
Que Tal Si Te Compro (2001)
El #1 de Jaripeno (2002)
Hechizo de Amor: Cien Por Ciento Norteño (2002)
15 Exitos al Estilo Norteño (2002)
Fantasia Loca (2003)
Tu, Yo y La Luna (2004)
La Noche Perfecta (2006)
Los Super Corridos (2006)
El Jaripeo (2006)
Los Mejores Corridos del Chapo de Sinaloa Con Banda (2006)
Con Banda Sinaloense 20 Exitos (2006)
Recostada en la Cama y Muchos Exitos Mas (2006)
Sus 12 Mejores Corridos (2006)
Te Va a Gustar (2007) U.S.#95
Mis Rancheras Consentidas (2007)
Para Siempre (2008)
Corridos Ke Mandan (2008)
Exitos De Siempre (2009)
Con La Fuerza Del Corrido (2009)
Apasionado (2010)
Corazon de niño (2011)
Triunfador (2012)
 Soy el raton 2018

Filmography

Television
Sueño de amor (2016) Jerónimo Durán

References

20th-century Mexican male singers
Living people
People from Badiraguato
Singers from Sinaloa
1964 births
21st-century Mexican male singers